Tower Mountain may refer to:

Canada
 Tower Mountain (British Columbia)

United States
 Tower Mountain (Colorado)
 Chenocetah Mountain or Tower Mountain, Habersham County, Georgia
 Tower Mountain (Massachusetts)
 Tower Mountain (Montana), a mountain in Beaverhead County
 Tower Mountain (New York), mountain in Delaware County, New York
 Tower Mountain (Oregon), the highest point in Umatilla County
 Tower Mountain (Washington)